ADAMTS13 (a disintegrin and metalloproteinase with a thrombospondin type 1 motif, member 13)—also known as von Willebrand factor-cleaving protease (VWFCP)—is a zinc-containing metalloprotease enzyme that cleaves von Willebrand factor (vWf), a large protein involved in blood clotting. It is secreted into the blood and degrades large vWf multimers, decreasing their activity.

Genetics
The ADAMTS13 gene maps to the ninth chromosome (9q34).

Discovery
Since 1982 it had been known that thrombotic thrombocytopenic purpura (TTP), one of the microangiopathic hemolytic anemias (see below), was characterized in its familial form by the presence in plasma of unusually large von Willebrand factor multimers (ULVWF).

In 1994, vWF was shown to be cleaved between a tyrosine at position 1605 and a methionine at 1606 by a plasma metalloprotease enzyme when it was exposed to high levels of shear stress. In 1996, two research groups independently further characterized this enzyme. In the next two years, the same two groups showed that the congenital deficiency of a vWF-cleaving protease was associated with formation of platelet microthrombi in the small blood vessels. In addition, they reported that IgG antibodies directed against this same enzyme caused TTP in a majority of non-familial cases.

Proteomics
Genomically, ADAMTS13 shares many properties with the 19 member ADAMTS family, all of which are characterised by a protease domain (the part that performs the protein hydrolysis), an adjacent disintegrin domain and one or more thrombospondin domains. ADAMTS13 in fact has eight thrombospondin domains. It has no hydrophobic transmembrane domain, and hence it is not anchored in the cell membrane.

Role in disease
Deficiency of ADAMTS13 was originally discovered in Upshaw Schulman Syndrome, the recurring familial form of thrombotic thrombocytopenic purpura. By that time it was already suspected that TTP occurred in the autoimmune form as well, owing to its response to plasmapheresis and characterisation of IgG inhibitors. Since the discovery of ADAMTS13, specific epitopes on its surface have been shown to be the target of inhibitory antibodies.

Low levels of ADAMTS13 are also associated with an increased risk of arterial thrombosis, including myocardial infarction and cerebrovascular disease.

Finally, since the link between aortic valve stenosis and angiodysplasia was proven to be due to high shear stress (Heyde's syndrome), it has been accepted that increased exposure of vWf to ADAMTS13 due to various reasons would predispose to bleeding by causing increased degradation of vWf. This phenomenon is characterised by a form of von Willebrand disease (type 2a).

See also 
 ADAMTS5

References

Further reading

External links 
 The MEROPS online database for peptidases and their inhibitors: M12.241
 
 Secreted protein database entry
 
 

EC 3.4.24
ADAMTS